Richard Dinnick (born 22 January 1968) is a British screenwriter, novelist, comic book writer and audio playwright. He is a frequent guest at writing events (including the London Screenwriters' Festival) and such Doctor Who conventions as Gallifrey One as well as San Diego Comic Con.

Dinnick is a member of the Writers Guild of Great Britain and the Royal Television Society and a Patron of the Children's Media Foundation.

Journalism 
Dinnick started his writing career on the local newspaper Esher News and Mail in 1986. He then specialised in business journalism, working on publications such as Director (the magazine published by the Institute of Directors) and Real Business as part of their editorial teams.

In the late 1990s, he moved to Internet Magazine. During this time he appeared on numerous TV and radio programmes as well as newspapers and industry web sites talking about internet-related matters. He was also shortlisted for the PPA's PTC New Journalist of the Year Award in 1999.

Later he went on to work on the City desk of the Sunday Express and chaired the Government Committee on Web Design Best Practice in 2002/3.

Writing career
Dinnick is the winner of the 2012 BBC Writersroom opportunity to create a new show and to write for TV on the BBC and went on to write for the CBeebies TV shows Tree Fu Tom and Go Jetters - amongst others - as well as Mind Candy's new Moshi Monsters TV show. He was one of six finalists in a 2014 BBC Academy opportunity to workshop a script for Waterloo Road. In 2015 Dinnick became Head Writer on the new Disney TV show Eena Meena Deeka and in-development action adventure show Captain Extraordinary. He was also a BAFTA Judge for Children's Drama and produced a session for the 2014 Children's Media Conference.

He is writing on the third series of Thunderbirds Are Go! for ITV/Amazon Studios and is developing several ideas for TV. These include the fantasy dramaNever After, primetime crime drama Murder of Crows, workplace drama No Kidding, and  The Last Horseman, an urban fantasy series. He is working on a web series for Capital City Entertainment, Light & Shadows (a.k.a.Dead Good). He also has a prime time TV crime drama in development with Chrysalis Vision, named "Surface Tension".

Dinnick has written prose, scripts and comics for such media properties including MGM's Stargate and the BBC's Doctor Who. He has the Sherlock Holmes stories of Sir Arthur Conan Doyle, including The Hound of the Baskervilles, for CD release. "The Underwater War" appeared in the tie-in Doctor Who: Alien Adventures, published by BBC Children's Books in 2010. He has since gone on to write books and short stories for Penguin UK, Titan Publishing, Black Library, Running Press and Snow Books. BBC Books published his tie-in collectionDoctor Who Myths & Legends in June 2017 and he is contributing to the Missy themed anthology - also from BBC Books - entitled 'The Missy Chronicles' to be published in 2018. He is also writing the foreword and contributing a story to the forthcoming anthology about Doctor Who Character, Brigadier Lethbridge-Stewart, called Lineage from Candy Jar Books.

He has also written comics for IDW, BBC Magazines and is currently the writer on Titan Comics Twelfth Doctor line of comics. An original graphic novel - Rob - has also been announced to be published in 2018 by Legendary Entertainment and WEBTOON alongside titles by Jessica Chobot and John Barrowman.

Television 
 Surface Tension (working title) - Chrysalis Vision (in development)
 Thunderbirds Are Go - Staff Writer - ITV Studios/Weta Workshop/Amazon Studios
 Eena Meena Deeka, Series 1 + 2 - Lead Writer - Maya/Cosmos/Disney
 Tree Fu Tom, Series 5, 6, 7 - Staff Writer - BBC/Freemantle
 Majid - Series 1 - Staff Writer - Majid Kids TV/Mondo TV 
 Karamella - Series 1 - Staff Writer - Majid Kids TV/Mondo TV
 Go Jetters, Series 1 - BBC/Worldwide
 Moshi Monsters TV Show, Series 1 - Mind Candy
 Captain Extraordinary, Series 1 - Head Writer - Rushfirth Creative ( In Development)
 Development Script, not-for-air pilot - BBC In House
 Development Script, broadcaster-owned IP for TV series - BBC
 Development Scripts, production company-owned IP for TV series - Maya/Cosmos

Audio scripts 
He has written scripts for several different franchises, largely for Big Finish Productions:
 Stargate: Duplicity (2012)
 Doctor Who - The Rings of Ikiria (2012)
 Doctor Who - The Wanderer (2012)
 Sherlock Holmes - The Tangled Skein (adaptation) (2012)
 Sherlock Holmes - The Hound of the Baskervilles (adaptation) (2011)
 Doctor Who - Recorded Time and Other Stories#Paradoxicide - "Paradoxicide" (2011)
 Doctor Who - Short Trips - Volume 4: "A Star is Born" (2011)
 Bernice Summerfield: Dead Man's Switch (with John Dorney) (2010)
 Sapphire & Steel: The Surest Poison (2005)
 Space: 1889: The Lunar Inheritance (with Andy Frankham-Allen) (2005)

Prose 
 Lethbridge Stewart: Lineage (Candy Jar Books, 2018)
 Doctor Who: Myths and Legends (BBC/Penguin Random House, 2017)
 Doctor Who: Underwater War (BBC/Penguin Random House, 2016) 
 Moshi Monsters: Super Moshi Missions (Mind Candy/Sunbird, 2012) (tie-in to Moshi Monsters)
 Doctor Who: Alien Adventures''' (BBC/Penguin, 2011) The Underwater War, included in an anthology of two stories.

 Short stories 
Dinnick's first fiction was the short story "Neptune" for Big Finish Productions' Doctor Who anthology Short Trips: Solar System. His published short stories are:
 Short Trips: The Solar System — "Neptune" (Big Finish, 2005)
 Bernice Summerfield: Present Danger — "Past Caring" (Big Finish, 2010)
 "Braking Point" for Stargate Magazine (Titan, 2010)
 Encounters of Sherlock Holmes — "The Adventure of the Swaddled Railwayman" (Titan, 2012)
 Twisted Histories — "Flaming Sword" (Snow Books, 2013)
 Doctor Who: The Missy Chronicles — "Alit in Underland" (BBC/Penguin Random House, 2018)

 Comics 
 Lost in Space - Countdown to Danger - volume #1: "Secrets" (Legendary Entertainment, December 2018 )
 Lost in Space - Countdown to Danger - volumes #2: "Quality Time" (Legendary Entertainment, May 2019)
 Lost in Space - Countdown to Danger - volumes #3: TBA (Legendary Entertainment, July 2019)
 "Doctor Who: The 13th Doctor" - Volume #0 (Titan Comics, September 2018) - The Many Lives of Doctor Who "Rob" - issues #1 - #6 (Legendary Entertainment/WEBTOON - TBA) - TBA
 "Doctor Who: The 12th Doctor" - issue #3.10 - #3.13 (Titan Comics, December 2017 - February 2018) - A Confusion of Angels "Doctor Who: The 12th Doctor" - issue #3.9 (Titan Comics, November 2017) - The Great Shopping Bill "Doctor Who: The 12th Doctor" - San Diego Comic Con Exclusive (Titan Comics, July 2017) - The Last Action Figure "Doctor Who: The 12th Doctor" - issues #3.5 - #3.8 (Titan Comics, July - September 2017) - The Wolves of Winter featuring the first run for new series companion Bill, and the Ice Warriors.
 Doctor Who Special 2012 - Time Fraud (IDW, September 2012)Doctor Who Adventures - "The Lunar Tyk" (issue #191, November 2010)

According to his website he is also writing several unannounced comic book projects for publishers that are yet to be confirmed.

 Non-fiction 
Dinnick has written a number of non-fiction works:
 The Internet Atlas (Parkgate, 2000)
 A History of the Internet (Pocket Essentials, 2002)
 The Big Finish Companion: Volume I (Big Finish, 2011)
 Moshi Monsters: The Official Collectable Figures Guide (Penguin, 2012)
 Doctor Who: The Official Anniversary Sticker Book (Penguin, 2013)
 Doctor Who - TARDIS (Running Press, 2013)
 Doctor Who - Dalek (Running Press, 2013)
 Doctor Who - Cyberman (Running Press, 2013)
 Doctor Who - Sonic Screwdriver (Running Press, 2014)
 Doctor Who - K9 (Running Press, 2015)
 Doctor Who - Weeping Angel (Running Press, 2015)
 Doctor Who - Adipose'' (Running Press, 2016)
 "Doctor Who - Supreme Dalek" (Running Press, 2016)

As editor:
 The Big Finish Companion: Volume II (Big Finish, 2013)

Honours & awards

 BAFTA Judge, The Children's BAFTA Awards, 2019
 Speaker, Norwich Sound and Vision Festival, 2019
 Judge, BBC Radio 2: 500 Words Competition, 2018
 Judge, BBC Radio 2: 500 Words Competition, 2017
 NBC Universal Writers Development Initiative, 2016
 Judge, BBC Radio 2: 500 Words Competition, 2016
 NBC Universal Writers Development Initiative, 2015
 Judge, BBC Radio 2: 500 Words Competition, 2015
 Speaker, Norwich Sound and Vision Festival, 2014
 Session Producer, The Children's Media Conference, 2014
 Judge, BBC Radio 2: 500 Words Competition, 2014

 BAFTA Judge, The Children's BAFTA Awards, 2013
 Judge, BBC Radio 2: 500 Words Competition, 2013
 Guest Speaker, The London Screenwriter's Festival, 2012
 Winner, BBC Writersroom TV Writing Opportunity, 2012
 Top Doctor Who Writers to Follow - Doctor Who Magazine, 2012
 Finalist, Duracell "Entangled” Script Competition, 2011
 Chair, Government Committee on Web Design Best Practice, 2001
 Finalist, PTC New Journalist of the Year Award, 1999

References

External links 
 
 
 Richard Dinnick on Facebook
 Richard Dinnick on Twitter
 Listing at Good Reads

Living people
1968 births
21st-century British male writers
Alumni of Middlesex University
British television writers
British male screenwriters
British science fiction writers
British male television writers
21st-century British screenwriters
People educated at Reed's School